Captain Fantastic is a 2016 American comedy-drama film written and directed by Matt Ross and starring Viggo Mortensen, Frank Langella, Kathryn Hahn, and Steve Zahn. The story centers on a family forced by circumstances to reintegrate into society after living in isolation for a decade.

The film had its world premiere at the Sundance Film Festival on January 23, 2016. It was screened in the Un Certain Regard section at the 2016 Cannes Film Festival. It was theatrically released on July 8, 2016, by Bleecker Street. It was chosen by the National Board of Review as one of the top ten independent films of 2016 and Mortensen was nominated for the Golden Globe, the BAFTA Award, and the Academy Award for Best Actor.

Plot
Ben Cash, his wife Leslie, and their six children live an isolated existence on ten acres in the mountainous Washington wilderness. They are former left-wing anarchist activists disillusioned with capitalism and American life, who choose to instill survivalist skills and left-wing politics and philosophy in their children.

They educate them to think critically, and train them to be physically fit, athletic, and self-reliant without dependence on modern technology. They are raised to coexist with nature, are given unique names, and celebrate Noam Chomsky's birthday instead of Christmas. The children are accustomed to reading many forms of college-level literature, and, while showing high aptitude and intelligence beyond their years, they are socially awkward as they have not been socialized with the outside world.

Ben has been raising the children on his own while Leslie is hospitalized in New Mexico for bipolar disorder, away from her family and near her wealthy elitist parents. She dies by suicide while undergoing treatment and Ben learns that her father Jack plans to hold a Christian burial despite Leslie being a philosophical Buddhist who abhorred religion. They argue over the phone, and Jack threatens to have Ben arrested if he attends the funeral. Ben initially decides not to go and prevents his children from doing so, but then changes his mind, driving his children across the country on a repurposed school bus.

The family briefly stays at the home of Ben's sister-in-law, Harper. She and her husband try to convince Ben that the children should attend school to receive a conventional education; in response, Ben quizzes Harper's children and his children on various topics, illustrating that his children are better educated and embarrassing Harper and her husband. Later on their road trip, some of Ben's children start to doubt him and his parenting skills. Rellian accuses him of failing to treat Leslie's mental health, and Bodevan accuses him of not equipping them for the real world, showing him acceptance letters from several top Ivy League colleges to which Leslie had helped him apply. 

Ben arrives at Leslie's funeral with their children and reads her will, which instructs her family to cremate her and flush her ashes down a toilet. In response, Jack has Ben forcibly removed from the church. Ben tries to convince Jack to respect Leslie's wishes, to no avail. Ben follows the funeral procession to the cemetery, planning to intercede despite a police presence and Jack's threat to have him arrested. Ben relents at his children's insistence that they cannot lose both of their parents.

Rellian runs away to live with his grandparents, who want custody of all the children. When Vespyr tries to clandestinely exfiltrate Rellian from their grandparents, she falls from the roof and narrowly avoids breaking her neck. Ben, shocked and guilty, allows Jack to take his children. Although the children bond with their grandparents, they quietly decide to follow Ben and reunite with him.

The children desire to honor Leslie's final wishes, and persuade Ben to help them. Exhuming her corpse, they burn it on a funeral pyre then flush her ashes down an airport toilet. Bodevan then leaves the family to travel through Namibia, while the rest settle into a more "real world" life on their farm. The final scene shows the family eating breakfast around the kitchen table with their father, waiting for the school bus to arrive.

Cast

 Viggo Mortensen as Ben Cash
 Frank Langella as Jack Bertrang
 Kathryn Hahn as Harper Bertrang
 Steve Zahn as Dave
 George MacKay as Bodevan Cash
 Samantha Isler as Kielyr Cash
 Annalise Basso as Vespyr Cash
 Nicholas Hamilton as Rellian Cash
 Shree Crooks as Zaja Cash
 Charlie Shotwell as Nai Cash
 Trin Miller as Leslie Abigail Cash
 Elijah Stevenson as Justin
 Teddy Van Ee as Jackson
 Erin Moriarty as Claire McCune
 Missi Pyle as Ellen McCune
 Ann Dowd as Abigail Bertrang

Production
The film was conceived by its writer and director, Matt Ross, as he began questioning the choices he and his wife were making as parents. He wondered what would happen if he were "completely present" in his children's lives while noting that modern technology had made that difficult. In making the film Ross also took autobiographical moments from his own life, notably being raised in what he termed as "alternative-living communities".

Viggo Mortensen was cast in February 2014. That June, it was announced that George MacKay, Annalise Basso, Samantha Isler, Nicholas Hamilton, Shree Crooks and newcomer Charlie Shotwell had also been cast. Much of the rest of the cast joined in July and August.

Principal photography on the film commenced in July 2014, in Western Washington, with additional photography in Portland, Oregon.

Release
In July 2014, eOne Entertainment acquired international distribution rights to the film. In August 2014, it was announced that Bleecker Street would distribute the film in the United States. The film had its world premiere at the 2016 Sundance Film Festival on January 23, 2016. The film was released on July 8, 2016. The film was aired in the Un Certain Regard section at the 2016 Cannes Film Festival, with Matt Ross winning the Best Director prize.

Reception

Box office
Captain Fantastic grossed $5.9 million in the United States and Canada and $15.4 million in other territories for a worldwide total of $21.3 million, against a production budget of $5 million.

Critical response
On review aggregator Rotten Tomatoes, the film has an approval rating of 83% based on 229 reviews, with an average rating of 7.10/10. The site's critical consensus reads, "Captain Fantastics thought-provoking themes—and an absorbing starring turn from Viggo Mortensen—add up to an above-average family drama with unexpected twists." On Metacritic, the film holds a score of 72 out of 100, based on 36 critics, indicating "generally favorable reviews". It received a ten-minute standing ovation at Cannes.

Alonso Duralde of TheWrap gave the film a positive review, saying, "The movie really belongs to Mortensen, who allows Ben to be exasperating, arrogant, and impatient but also warm, loving, and caring. He's a tough but adoring father, a grieving widower and a passionate defender of his wife's final wishes, and Mortensen plays all these notes, and more with subtlety and grace". Peter Debruge of Variety gave the film a positive review, saying "Boasting half a dozen impressive youth performances alongside a leading role that takes full advantage of Mortensen's own sensitive, back-to-nature spirit, Captain Fantastic easily ranks among the most polished and relatable of this year's Sundance offerings."

A negative review from The Guardian's Peter Bradshaw states, "There's a meaty whiff of phony-baloney in this fatuous and tiresome movie, replete with forced emotional crises and wrong notes, topped off with an excruciatingly unearned, sentimental ending. It's a low-cal version of Peter Weir's 1986 movie The Mosquito Coast, starring someone who is essentially a cross between Charles Manson and Captain von Trapp."

Sheila O'Malley of RogerEbert.com believes "It's the attitude of the film that's the problem" and it "could have used a lot more skepticism". While praising the cast, she writes that the film "treats the situation (and Ben) so uncritically and so sympathetically that there is a total disconnect between what is actually onscreen and what Ross thinks is onscreen".

Accolades

Notes

References

External links
 
 
 
 
 Official screenplay

2016 films
2016 comedy-drama films
American comedy-drama films
2016 independent films
Films about bipolar disorder
Bleecker Street films
Environmental films
Films about dysfunctional families
Films directed by Matt Ross (actor)
Films scored by Alex Somers
Films set in New Mexico
Films set in Washington (state)
Films shot in New Mexico
Films shot in Portland, Oregon
Films shot in Washington (state)
Films with screenplays by Matt Ross (actor)
Films about parenting
2010s English-language films
2010s American films